The 2021–22 Kentucky Wildcats women's basketball team represented the University of Kentucky during the 2021–22 NCAA Division I women's basketball season. The Wildcats, led by second-year head coach Kyra Elzy, will play most of their home games at Memorial Coliseum and two at Rupp Arena and compete as members of the Southeastern Conference (SEC).

In the January 27 loss to Vanderbilt, senior guard Rhyne Howard scored her 2,000th point in her college career. Howard becomes the third Wildcat to reach that benchmark.

Previous season
The Wildcats finished the season 18–9 (9–6 SEC) to finish tied for fifth place in the conference. The Wildcats were invited to the 2021 NCAA Division I women's basketball tournament where they defeated Idaho State in the First Round before losing to Iowa in the Second Round.

Offseason

Departures

2021 recruiting class

Roster

Schedule

|-
!colspan=9 style=| Exhibition

|-
!colspan=9 style=| Non-conference regular season

|-
!colspan=9 style=| SEC regular season

|-
!colspan=9 style=| SEC Tournament

|-
!colspan=9 style=| NCAA tournament

See also
2021–22 Kentucky Wildcats men's basketball team

References

Kentucky Wildcats women's basketball seasons
Kentucky
Kentucky Wildcats
Kentucky Wildcats
Kentucky